Giovanni Lupi, commonly known as Nino, (24 December 1908 – 20 November 1990) was a Swiss footballer who played in the 1920s and 1930s. He played as midfielder.

Football career
From 1925 Lupi played for FC Chiasso who at that time played in the Serie B, the second tier of Swiss football. Following the 1926–27 season Chiasso won promotion to the Serie A.

In 1929 Lupi was called up for the Swiss national team. He played his debut for them on 6 October in the away game against Czechoslovakia. The Swiss were beaten 0–5 and this remained his only appearance for his country.

Lupi joined FC Basel's first team for their 1931–32 season under coach Gustav Putzendopler. After playing in one test game, Lupi played his domestic league debut for the club in the home game in the Landhof on 30 August 1931 as Basel were defeated 1–4 by Young Fellows Zürich.

He played with the team only half a year and during this time Lupi played a total of five games for Basel without scoring a goal. Three of these games were in the Serie A and two were friendly games.

References

Sources
 Rotblau: Jahrbuch Saison 2017/2018. Publisher: FC Basel Marketing AG. 
 Die ersten 125 Jahre. Publisher: Josef Zindel im Friedrich Reinhardt Verlag, Basel. 
 Verein "Basler Fussballarchiv" Homepage

FC Chiasso players
FC Basel players
Swiss men's footballers
Switzerland international footballers
Association football midfielders
Swiss Super League players
1908 births
1990 deaths